The 2015 Nigerian Senate election in Kogi State was held on March 28, 2015, to elect members of the Nigerian Senate to represent Kogi State. Atai Aidoko representing Kogi East and Ogembe Ahmed representing Kogi Central won on the platform of Peoples Democratic Party, while Dino Melaye representing Kogi West won on the platform of All Progressives Congress.

Overview

Summary

Results

Kogi East 
Peoples Democratic Party candidate Atai Aidoko won the election, defeating All Progressives Congress candidate Abdulrahman Abubakar and other party candidates.

Kogi Central 
Peoples Democratic Party candidate Ogembe Ahmed won the election, defeating All Progressives Congress candidate Mohammed Abdulsalami and other party candidates.

Kogi West 
All Progressives Congress candidate Dino Melaye won the election, defeating Peoples Democratic Party candidate Smart Adeyemi and other party candidates.

References 

Kogi State Senate elections
March 2015 events in Nigeria
Kog